Love Letter for Fire is a collaborative album by American singer-songwriter Sam Beam, commonly known as Iron & Wine, and American singer-songwriter Jesca Hoop, released on April 15, 2016, on Sub Pop.

Love Letter for Fire was recorded at Flora Recording & Playback in Portland, Oregon. The album features contributions from Wilco's Glenn Kotche, Rob Burger, Eyvind Kang, Sebastian Steinberg, and Edward Rankin-Parker. It was produced, recorded, and mixed by Tucker Martine. Iron & Wine and Jesca Hoop toured North America in support of the album, starting in May 2016.

Critical reception

Love Letter for Fire received largely positive reviews from contemporary music critics. At Metacritic, which assigns a normalized rating out of 100 to reviews from mainstream critics, the album received an average score of 79, based on 17 reviews, which indicates "generally favorable reviews".

Emmanuel Elone of PopMatters praised the album, stating, "By playing on the strengths of both artists while minimizing any deficiencies each may have, Sam Beam and Jesca Hoop have mastered the collaborative album. Where Iron & Wine can sound a bit too sleepy, Hoop plays up her vocals or instrumentation to keep the music lively; if she begins to make her performance a bit too grandiose, Beam is there to keep her feet on level ground. As a whole, Love Letter for Fire is the sonic equivalent of sitting in front of a campfire on the starry night with a couple of close friends strumming their acoustic guitar; it’s bucolic, simple, and guaranteed to delight. So grab some hot chocolate, put on the most comfortable pair of sweatpants that you can find, and let Sam Beam and Jesca Hoop serenade you with their majestic voices. If that’s not magical, nothing is."

Allison Hussey of Pitchfork Media gave the album a favorable review, stating, "Instead of a love letter to consuming blazes, Hoop's and Beam's collection appeals to our individual internal pilot lights: those softly smoldering flames that illuminate moments of beauty in ourselves, in each other, and beyond." Mark Deming of AllMusic gave the album a favorable review, stating, "Love Letter for Fire sounds like Beam and Hoop were born to work together. The yin and yang of their individual perspectives fit together marvelously, and this rests comfortably with the best of both their recorded works."

Accolades

Track listing

Personnel
Credits adapted from the liner notes of Love Letter for Fire.

Main personnel
 Sam Beam – guitar, vocals, songwriting
 Jesca Hoop – guitar, vocals, songwriting
 Rob Burger – keyboards, string arrangement
 Sebastian Steinberg – bass
 Edward Rankin-Parker – cello
 Glenn Kotche – drums, percussion
 Eyvind Kang – violin, viola

Additional personnel
 Tucker Martine – production, recording, mixing
 Michael Finn – assistant engineering
 Richard Dodd – mastering
 John Golden – vinyl mastering
 Keegan Curry – additional technician assistance
 Josh Wool – back cover photography
 Lissa Gotwals – front cover photography
 Dusty Summers – design
 Jesca Hoop – design
 Sam Beam – design

Charts

References

2016 albums
Iron & Wine albums
Jesca Hoop albums
Sub Pop albums
Collaborative albums
Vocal duet albums
Albums produced by Tucker Martine